This is a list of Academy Award winners and nominees from Austria.

Best Picture

Best Director

Best Actor in a Leading Role

Best Actor in a Supporting Role

Best Actress in a Leading Role

Best Actress in a Supporting Role

Best Adapted Screenplay

Best Original Screenplay

Best Story

Best International Feature Film

Best Art Direction

Best Cinematography

Best Costume Design

Best Documentary

Best Editing

Best Original Score

Best Original Song

Best Sound Mixing

Technical & Scientifical

Nominations and Winners

References

Lists of Academy Award winners and nominees by nationality or region
Academy Award winners and nominees
Academy Award winners and nominees
Academy Award winners and nominees
Austrian film-related lists